Edward Lee may refer to:

 Edward Lee (basketball) (1925–1988), Chinese Olympic basketball player
 Edward Lee (writer) (born 1957), American horror writer
 Edward Lee (bishop) (1482–1544), Archbishop of York, 1531–1544
 Edward Merwin Lee (1835–1913), Union officer during the American Civil War
 Edward Lee, 1st Earl of Lichfield (1663–1716), English peer
 Edward Edson Lee (1884–1944), American children's literature author
 Edward Lee (billiards player) (1905–1969), American professional carom billiards player
 Edward Lee (footballer), early 20th century English association footballer
 Edward Lee (scientist) (1914–2001), British scientist, inventor, and civil servant
 Edward Graham Lee (born 1931), former Canadian ambassador to Israel
 Edward Lee (politician) (1822–1883), New Zealand politician
 Edward Lee (cricketer) (1877–1942), English cricketer
 Edward Lee (chef), American chef
 Edward A. Lee (born 1957), Puerto Rican computer scientist, electrical engineer, and author
 Edward Lee Poh Lin (1949–2011), Malaysian politician

See also 
 Edward Leigh (disambiguation)
 Edward Lea (1837–1863), U.S. Naval officer
 Eddie Li, Hong Kong actor and model
 Ed Lee (disambiguation)